Pan Pan may refer to:

 Pan Pan (kingdom), an ancient Hindu kingdom
 Pan-pan, an urgency call
 Pan Pan (giant panda), 1985–2016
 Pan Pan (badminton) (born 1986), Chinese badminton player
 Panhard 178, a French armoured car nick-named Pan-Pan
 Pan Pan, a character from the web animation Homestar Runner